A confession is a statement – made by a person or by a group of persons – acknowledging some personal fact that the person (or the group) would ostensibly prefer to keep hidden. The term presumes that the speaker is providing information that he believes the other party is not already aware of, and is frequently associated with an admission of a moral or legal wrong:

Not all confessions reveal wrongdoing, however. For example, a confession of love is often considered positive both by the confessor and by the recipient of the confession and is a common theme in literature. With respect to confessions of wrongdoing, there are several specific kinds of confessions that have significance beyond the social. A legal confession involves an admission of some wrongdoing that has a legal consequence, while the concept of confession in religion varies widely across various belief systems, and is usually more akin to a ritual by which the person acknowledges thoughts or actions considered sinful or morally wrong within the confines of the confessor's religion. In some religions, confession takes the form of an oral communication to another person. Socially, however, the term may refer to admissions that are neither legally nor religiously significant.

Psychology 
Confession often benefits the one who is confessing. Paul Wilkes characterizes confession as "a pillar of mental health" because of its ability to relieve anxieties associated with keeping secrets.
Confessants are more likely to confess when the expected benefits outweigh the marginal costs (when the benefit of the offense to them is high, the cost to the victim is low, and the probability of information leakage is high). People may undertake social confessions in order to relieve feelings of guilt or to seek forgiveness from a wronged party, but such confessions may also serve to create social bonds between the confessant and the confessor, and may prompt the listener to reply with confessions of their own. A person may therefore confess wrongdoing to another person as a means of creating such a social bond, or of extracting reciprocal information from the other person. A confession may be made in a self-aggrandizing manner, as a way for the confessant to claim credit for a misdeed for the purpose of eliciting a reaction to that claim.

Law

In law, there is an exception to the hearsay rule that allows testimony concerning someone else's confession to be admitted if the statement had a great enough tendency "to expose the declarant to civil or criminal liability". The theory is that a reasonable person would not make such a false confession. In U.S. law, a confession must be voluntary in order to be admissible. Confessions (whether forced or otherwise) may feature in formal or informal show trials.

In India sections 24 to 30 of Indian Evidence Act, 1872 deals with confession, but the word confession has not been defined in any statute. It has been judicially interpreted to mean an admission  of all the ingredients of an offence. Pakala Narayan Swami v. Emperor, AIR 1939 PC 47 Section 24 mandates a confession must be voluntary. Section 25 renders invalid a confession made to a police officer. Section 26 deals with confession in police custody. Section 27 provides the circumstances under which and to what extent a confession in police custody is admissible.

It reads: 

According to section 30 of Indian Evidence Act, when two or more persons are tried jointly, a confession by one accused incriminating  himself and others is relevant.

Medicine
Dr. Suzanne Karan, a residency program director at the University of Rochester Department of Anesthesiology and Perioperative Medicine, initiated confessions sessions in residency education. In 2015, Dr. Karan published her research on confessions and it was concluded that the use of confessions sessions provided an opportunity to reflect, discuss, and admit without fear of punitive actions and allowed for early intervention on the issues that are relevant to physician trainees.

Socialisation
Public confessions play a role in struggle sessions
and in other methods of social control and influence involving self-criticism.

See also
 Atonement in Judaism
 Repentance

References

External links

 
Human communication
Secrecy